Bahlulabad (also Romanized as Bahlūlābād) is a village in Nazluchay Rural District, Nazlu District, Urmia County, West Azerbaijan Province, Iran. At the 2006 census, its population was 751, in 134 families.

References 

Populated places in Urmia County